Sabrilla Brunet (born 20 August 1982 in Lens) is a French professional blackball player. She is a multiple time world and European blackball champion.

Career 

Brunet began playing billiards at the age of 15. Brunet won two consecutive world blackball championships in 2012 and 2014. She was also a four time European blackball champion.

Nicknamed the gold star of billiards, she was also part of the women's French team champion of Europe and the World in 2013 and also the winning team in the European event in 2014.

Notes and references 

French pool players
Female pool players
French sportswomen
1982 births
Living people
People from Lens, Pas-de-Calais
Sportspeople from Pas-de-Calais
21st-century French women